In analytical mechanics (particularly Lagrangian mechanics), generalized forces are conjugate to generalized coordinates.  They are obtained from the applied forces , acting on a system that has its configuration defined in terms of generalized coordinates.  In the formulation of virtual work, each generalized force is the coefficient of the variation of a generalized coordinate.

Virtual work
Generalized forces can be obtained from the computation of the virtual work, of the applied forces.

The virtual work of the forces, acting on the particles , is given by

where  is the virtual displacement of the particle .

Generalized coordinates
Let the position vectors of each of the particles, be a function of the generalized coordinates, .  Then the virtual displacements  are given by

where  is the virtual displacement of the generalized coordinate .  

The virtual work for the system of particles becomes

Collect the coefficients of  so that

Generalized forces
The virtual work of a system of particles can be written in the form

where

are called the generalized forces associated with the generalized coordinates .

Velocity formulation
In the application of the principle of virtual work it is often convenient to obtain virtual displacements from the velocities of the system.  For the n particle system, let the velocity of each particle Pi be , then the virtual displacement   can also be written in the form

This means that the generalized force, can also be determined as

D'Alembert's principle
D'Alembert formulated the dynamics of a particle as the equilibrium of the applied forces with an inertia force (apparent force), called D'Alembert's principle.  The inertia force of a particle, of mass  is

where  is the acceleration of the particle.

If the configuration of the particle system depends on the generalized coordinates , then the generalized inertia force is given by

D'Alembert's form of the principle of virtual work yields

References

See also
Lagrangian mechanics
Generalized coordinates
Degrees of freedom (physics and chemistry)
Virtual work

Mechanics
Classical mechanics
Lagrangian mechanics